Sheyban (also Romanized as Sheybān; also known as Sheybāni) is a city in the Central District of Bavi County, Khuzestan Province, Iran.  At the 2016 census, its population was 36,374, in 9,637 families.

References

Populated places in Bavi County

Cities in Khuzestan Province